Lamuk may refer to:
 Bala Lamuk
 Pain Lamuk